Pronorites is a prolecanitid genus from the middle and upper Carboniferous, upper Mississippian and Pennsylvanian.  Distribution is wide spread.

Pronorites, as for the Pronoritidae, produced discoidal shells with no prominent sculpture, in which the ventral lobe of the suture has three prongs.  In Pronorites the prongs of the 1st lateral lobe are simple, undivided.

References
Notes

Bibliography
Miller, Furnish, and Schindewolf (1957) Paleozoic Ammonidea, Treatise on Invertebrate Paleontology Part L, Ammonoidea. Geological Soc. of America. 
Weblinks
Pronorites in  Goniat online 9/3/13.

Mississippian ammonites
Ammonites of South America
Ammonites of Australia
Mississippian first appearances
Pennsylvanian extinctions
Pennsylvanian ammonites
Viséan life
Prolecanitida
Ammonite genera